Ty'n-yr-eithin is a hamlet in the community of Tregaron, Ceredigion, Wales, which is 62.4 miles (100.4 km) from Cardiff and 171.2 miles (275.4 km) from London. Ty'n-yr-eithin is represented in the Senedd by Elin Jones (Plaid Cymru) and is part of the Ceredigion constituency in the House of Commons.

See also 
 List of localities in Wales by population

References 

Villages in Ceredigion
Tregaron